Egg Island is a small island, with an area of 0.83 ha, in south-eastern Australia.  It is part of the North Coast Group, lying in Bass Strait on Horseshoe Reef near Devonport in north-west Tasmania.  It has been identified as an Important Bird Area (IBA) because of its globally significant colony of black-faced cormorants.
Wright Island is nearby.

Fauna
Recorded breeding seabird species include little penguin, black-faced cormorant (over 500 pairs), silver gull, crested tern and Caspian tern.

References

Islands of Tasmania
North West Tasmania
Important Bird Areas of Tasmania